Joseph Eubanks (born 1975) is an American retired professional wrestler best known by the ring name Lobo. He wrestled primarily in Combat Zone Wrestling (CZW), where he won every major championship and was the first inductee into the CZW Hall of Fame in 2004.

Professional wrestling career 
Along with Nick Gage, Justice Pain, and Ric Blade, Lobo was trained by John Zandig at the CZW Wrestling School and graduated first in the class. He became one of the main wrestlers in CZW along with other graduates from the school. In February 1999, Lobo became the second Iron Man Champion. He held the title until June when he lost it to Justice Pain. These two continued wrestling each other and competed in the first ever Cage of Death match at the first Cage of Death show. Lobo won the match and regained the title. He would lose this title to Wifebeater, but regain it one more time the following year.

Lobo also challenged for the CZW Heavyweight Championship. He feuded with Zandig for the title and finally beat him in July 2000. He held the title until Cage of Death II. At that show, Lobo successfully defended the championship against Zandig in the Cage of Death match. Directly following this match, Justice Pain came out and fought Lobo in another Cage of Death match. In the match, Lobo was thrown from the top of the cage to the ground through a table covered in barbed wire. Justice Pain went on to win the match and the title.  After losing the title, Lobo continued feuding with Zandig. This time, the feud was for ownership of CZW. On February 9, 2002, Lobo defeated Zandig to become the new owner of CZW. He held this position until Cage of Death IV when Zandig defeated him to regain his position as CZW's owner 

He took some time off from CZW following the Cage of Death match. While he was gone, a new group called the Hi-V tried to take over CZW, with Zandig as their main target. Zandig was planning to face the Hi-V at Cage of Death V, but the stable outnumbered his team 6 to 4. At Night of Infamy II,
Lobo made a shocking return to help Zandig and join his team just in time for Cage of Death.  Their team was successful. In February 2004, Lobo became the first inductee to the CZW Hall of Fame. After this, Lobo remained inactive for the following two years.

At Cage of Death 7, Zandig, who had turned on the fans, wanted to run CZW the way they used to. He called out Lobo, who was backstage for the event, and they joined each other along with Justice Pain and Nick Gage. They would later call themselves the Forefathers of CZW.

Championships and accomplishments 
Combat Zone Wrestling
CZW Interpromotional Hardcore Championship (1 time)
CZW Iron Man Championship]] (3 times)
CZW World Heavyweight Championship]] (1 time)
CZW World Tag Team Championship (1 time) - with T.C.K.
CZW Hall of Fame (2004)

Notes
General

Specific

External links
 

1975 births
Living people
Professional wrestlers from Pennsylvania
People from Philadelphia
Combat Zone Wrestling
American male professional wrestlers
CZW World Heavyweight Champions
CZW Iron Man Champions
21st-century professional wrestlers